Kathrota is a village and former non-salute princely state on Saurashtra peninsula in Gujarat, western India.

History 
The petty princely state, in Sorath prant, was ruled by Kathi Chieftains.

In 1901 it comprised a single village, with a population of 138, yielding 2,300 Rupees state revenue (1903-4, nearly all from land), paying 52 Rupees tribute to the Gaikwar Baroda State.

References

External links and Sources 
 Imperial Gazetteer, on DSAL.UChicago.edu - Kathiawar

Princely states of Gujarat